Haselrieder is a German surname. Notable people with the surname include:

Doris Haselrieder, Italian luger
Oswald Haselrieder (born 1971), Italian luger, husband of Doris

German-language surnames
Surnames of South Tyrolean origin